Wang Chunning (born March 1963) is a general of the People's Liberation Army of China, currently serving as commander of the People's Armed Police. He was promoted to the rank of major general (shaojiang) in 2011, lieutenant general (zhongjiang) in July 2017, and general (Shangjiang) in December 2020.

Biography
Wang was born in Nanjing, Jiangsu, in March 1963, while his ancestral home is in Muping District of Yantai, Shandong. His father  was a lieutenant general. 

He entered politics in July 1985, and joined the Communist Party of China in April 1986. In 2009 he was promoted to chief of staff of the 1st Group Army. He was its deputy commander in 2010, and held that office until 2014. In January 2014 he succeeded Han Weiguo as commander of the 12th Group Army. In January 2020, he became a member of Standing Committee of the CPC Beijing Municipal Committee. In April 2020, he was appointed chief of staff of the People's Armed Police. He was promoted to its commander in December of that same year.

References

1963 births
Living people
People from Nanjing
People's Liberation Army generals from Jiangsu
People's Republic of China politicians from Jiangsu
Chinese Communist Party politicians from Jiangsu
Commanders of the People's Armed Police
Alternate members of the 19th Central Committee of the Chinese Communist Party